Puppet Animation Scotland is a Scottish organisation that promotes and develops puppetry and animation as art forms. They have two annual festivals, the Puppet Animation Festival and the Manipulate Visual Theatre Festival, and offer classes for young practitioners preparing for entry into the sector.

Puppet Animation Scotland is supported by Creative Scotland.

References

External links 
Puppet Animation Scotland
Puppet Animation Festival
manipulate Festival
Edinburgh Festival Guide Puppet Animation Festival Listing

1984 establishments in Scotland
Puppet museums
Performing arts in Scotland
Arts organisations based in Scotland
Amusement museums in the United Kingdom
Puppetry in the United Kingdom